Ambrósio Amaro Manuel Pascoal best known as Rats, (born 5 May 1977) is a retired Angolan football player. He has played for Angola national team.

National team statistics

References

1977 births
Living people
Angolan footballers
Association football midfielders
Académica Petróleos do Lobito players
Girabola players
Angola international footballers